A pop-up canopy (or portable gazebo or frame tent in some countries) is a shelter that collapses down to a size that is portable. Typically, canopies of this type come in sizes from five feet by five feet to ten feet by twenty feet. Larger or semi-permanent canopies are known as "marquees".

Structure

Most pop-up canopies come in two pieces, the canopy frame and the canopy top. The canopy frame is constructed of either steel or aluminium. Steel framed canopies are heavier and typically cost less than aluminium frames. Recently, stainless steel has been used because it is lighter than steel and stronger than aluminium.

Tops for most canopies are made from a polyester fabric.

Most pop-up canopies are open-sided and without walls, distinguishing them from larger marquees or semi-permanent shelters.

Uses
Pop up canopies have become very popular for sporting events, festivals and trade shows. They are also known as pit tents when used in the context of amateur or semi-professional motorsport.

Some commercial canopy companies are even beginning to silk screen and digitally print on the custom canopy tops to promote the company using them.

See also
Pole marquee (a larger version of the above)
Gazebo
Tent
Aid station

References

Gardening For Dummies by Shirley Stackhouse & Jennifer Stackhouse (John Wiley & Sons, 2013)
Patio Roofs & Gazebos: A Complete Guide to Planning, Design, and Construction (Oxmoor House, 2007)

Portable buildings and shelters